Scorpion in Love is a 2013 Spanish romantic drama film directed by Santiago A. Zannou and starring Álex González, Miguel Ángel Silvestre, Carlos Bardem, Judith Diakhate and Javier Bardem.  It is based on the novel of the same name by Carlos Bardem, who also wrote the screenplay with Zannou.

Plot
Julián, Asterix and Luis belong to a neo-Nazi ideology group led by Solís. Together with other members of the group, they attack everything considered the enemy with threats and beatings. Julián frequents Pedro's gym and asks him to teach him to box. Carlomonte distrusts Julián but starts training him. Alyssa, a young mulatto with whom Julián falls in love, also works at the gym. Her love for Alyssa and boxing make Julián begin to change, something that her friend Luis is not willing to accept.

Cast

Production 
The film is a Morena Films (Álvaro Longoria) production, with the participation of TVE, Cosmopolitan Channel and Canal+ España.

Release 
Distributed by Alta Films, Scorpion in Love was theatrically released in Spain on 12 April 2013.

Accolades 

|-
| align = "center" rowspan = "8" | 2014 || rowspan = "4" | 28th Goya Awards || Best Adapted Screenplay || Carlos Bardem, Santiago A. Zannou ||  || align = "center" rowspan = "4" | 
|-
| Best Supporting Actor || Carlos Bardem || 
|-
| Best New Actor || Hovik Keuchkerian || 
|-
| Best Art Direction || Llorenç Miquel || 
|-
| rowspan = "4" | 23rd Actors and Actresses Union Awards || Best Film Actor in a Leading Role || Álex González ||  || rowspan = "4" | 
|-
| Best Film Actor in a Secondary Role || Carlos Bardem || 
|-
| Best Film Actor in a Minor Role || Miguel Ángel Silvestre || 
|-
| Best New Actor || Hovik Keuchkerian || 
|}

See also 
 List of Spanish films of 2013

References

External links
 

2010s Spanish-language films
Films based on Spanish novels
Spanish romantic drama films
2013 romantic drama films
Films about neo-Nazis
Morena Films films
Spanish boxing films
2010s Spanish films